Ernest Gwyn Richards (22 December 1905 – 17 December 1985) was a Welsh rugby union and professional rugby league footballer who played in the 1920s and 1930s.

Background
Gwyn Richards was born in Bryncethin, Wales, and he died aged 79 in Bridgend, Wales.

Playing career

International honours
Gwyn Richards won a cap for Wales (RU) while at Cardiff RFC in 1927 against Scotland.

Challenge Cup Final appearances
Gwyn Richards played  and scored a try in Huddersfield's 21–17 victory over Warrington in the 1933 Challenge Cup Final during the 1932–33 season at Wembley Stadium, London on Saturday 6 May 1933. and played  in the 8-11 defeat by Castleford in the 1935 Challenge Cup Final during the 1934–35 season at Wembley Stadium, London on Saturday 4 May 1935, in front of a crowd of 39,000.

References

External links
Search for "Richards" at rugbyleagueproject.org

1905 births
1985 deaths
Bridgend RFC players
Bryncethin RFC players
Cardiff RFC players
Footballers who switched code
Huddersfield Giants players
Leigh Leopards players
Rugby league five-eighths
Rugby league players from Bridgend County Borough
Rugby union fly-halves
Rugby union players from Bridgend County Borough
Wales international rugby union players
Welsh rugby league players
Welsh rugby union players